Hugh Gibson Cameron (1 February 1927 – 9 December 2009) was a Scottish professional footballer, playing as a left winger. He was born Blantyre, South Lanarkshire.

Hugh Cameron began his professional career with Clyde who he joined from Burnbank Athletic. In May 1948 he moved to Torquay United. He settled in quickly at Plainmoor, and played impressively enough to earn a £4,500 move to Newcastle United in April 1951. He had played 120 league games, scoring 17 times for the Gulls. He found it hard to establish himself on Tyneside, playing only twice before a £500 move to Second Division strugglers Bury. He scored once in 29 league games for the Shakers before moving on again, this time to Workington in November 1953. He played 54 league games for Workington, scoring 4 times before returning to Scotland to play for St Mirren.

References

External links

1927 births
2009 deaths
People from Blantyre, South Lanarkshire
Scottish footballers
Association football wingers
Clyde F.C. players
Torquay United F.C. players
Newcastle United F.C. players
Bury F.C. players
Workington A.F.C. players
St Mirren F.C. players
Burnbank Athletic F.C. players
Scottish Junior Football Association players
Scottish Football League players
English Football League players
Footballers from South Lanarkshire